Ernesto Amantegui Phumipha (born 16 April 1990) is a professional footballer who plays as a left-back for Thai club BG Pathum United. Born in Spain, he represents the Thailand national team.

Club career
Born in Oviedo, Asturias, to a Spanish father of Basque descent and a Thai mother, Amantegui played for local side Real Oviedo, making his debut with the first team on 17 May 2009 in a Tercera División match against CD Condal but spending the vast majority of his two-year spell with the reserves. He continued competing in the third level in the following years, with CD Mirandés and Sporting de Gijón B, contributing with 1,015 minutes of action as the former club promoted to the Segunda División for the first time in its history.

Amantegui signed for Thai Premier League side Buriram United F.C. on 23 June 2013, moving to fellow league team Army United F.C. for the 2014 campaign. He continued to play at that level in the following years, with Bangkok United FC, Air Force Central FC, Muangthong United F.C. and  Samut Prakan City FC.

He was unveiled as Kirins' new signing in 2019.  He made six appearances for the team before moving to Samut Prakan City F.C. which see him flourished under the guidance of the new team.

Before the start of 2021 season, he moved to BG Pathum United F.C.

Club statistics

Honours

Club
BG Pathum United
 Thailand Champions Cup: 2021, 2022

References

External links
Bangkok United official profile

1990 births
Living people
Footballers from Oviedo
Ernesto Amantegui Phumipha
Ernesto Amantegui Phumipha
Spanish footballers
Spanish people of Thai descent
Ernesto Amantegui Phumipha
Association football defenders
Segunda División B players
Tercera División players
Real Oviedo Vetusta players
Real Oviedo players
CD Mirandés footballers
Sporting de Gijón B players
Ernesto Amantegui Phumipha
Ernesto Amantegui Phumipha
Ernesto Amantegui Phumipha
Ernesto Amantegui Phumipha
Ernesto Amantegui Phumipha
Ernesto Amantegui Phumipha
Ernesto Amantegui Phumipha
Ernesto Amantegui Phumipha
Spanish expatriate footballers
Expatriate footballers in Thailand
Spanish expatriate sportspeople in Thailand
Thai expatriate sportspeople in Spain